Princess Phương Mai, Duchess of Addis Abeba (1 August 1937 – 16 January 2021) was a daughter of Emperor Bảo Đại of Vietnam and his first wife, Empress Nam Phương. In 1947, Nam Phương left Vietnam with her children and lived at the Château Thorens, outside of Cannes, France. Phương Mai received her education in France and returned to Vietnam from 1949 to 1953. She was educated at Convent des Oiseaux in Verneuil sur Seine, France.

On 5 August 1971, in Paris, France, Princess Phương Mai married Pietro Badoglio, 2nd Duke of Addis Abeba and Marquess of Sabotino; they had two children, a son and a daughter:

 The Noble Signora Donna Manuela Badoglio (born at Dijon, France, on 26 June 1959).
 The Noble Signor Don Flavio Badoglio, 3rd Duke of Addis Abeba (born in Paris, France, on 20 March 1973). Educated at the American School of Paris. 

She died on 16 January 2021 at Louveciennes, France, aged 83 years old.

Ancestry

References

1937 births
2021 deaths
People from Da Lat
Vietnamese Roman Catholics
Nguyen dynasty princesses
Italian nobility
Daughters of emperors